Guangdong music may refer to:

Music of Guangdong
Guangdong music (genre), a genre of music also known as Cantonese music